Lawn Bowls at the 1983 South Pacific Games was held from 5 to 16 September 1983 in Apia, Western Samoa.

Men's results

Women's results

See also
 Lawn bowls at the Pacific Games

References

Lawn bowls at the Pacific Games